Volucribacter psittacicida is a bacterium from the genus of Volucribacter. Volucribacter psittacicida can cause infections of the respiratory tract, sepsis, diarrhea and inflammation in Psittaciformes.

References

Pasteurellales
Bacteria described in 2004